The SLFA President's Cup is a knockout football tournament held in Saint Lucia that is open to the top two clubs from 19 districts that are affiliated with the Saint Lucia Football Association. The competition began in 2015.

Past winners 

 2015: Young Roots
 2016: VSADC 2–1 TiRocher

References 

President
National association football cups
Recurring sporting events established in 2015